Ludwig Fischer (17 December 1915 in Straubing – 8 March 1991 in Bad Reichenhall) was a racing driver from Germany, who raced successfully throughout the 1950s and into the early 1960s, mainly in German Formula Two, but also in hillclimbing and Formula Junior.

His single World Championship Formula One entry was at the 1952 German Grand Prix in a privately run AFM-BMW, but he did not start the race despite all 32 entrants (Fischer was 31st fastest) being considered as having qualified.

Complete Formula One World Championship results
(key)

References

1915 births
1991 deaths
German racing drivers
German Formula One drivers
People from Straubing
Sportspeople from Lower Bavaria
Racing drivers from Bavaria